George Fugett Turman (January 25, 1928 – December 9, 2008) was the 24th Lieutenant Governor of Montana. Originally a Republican state legislator before becoming a Democrat, he was elected to the position in 1980 on a ticket with fellow Democrat Ted Schwinden. They were re-elected in 1984. Turman relinquished the position in 1988. He died of natural causes on December 9, 2008 in Missoula, Montana, aged 80.

References

Lieutenant Governors of Montana
1928 births
2008 deaths
Mayors of Missoula, Montana
Members of the Montana House of Representatives
Montana Democrats
Montana Republicans
20th-century American politicians